Pelolinea is a bacteria genus from the family of Anaerolineaceae with one known species (Pelolinea submarina). Pelolinea submarina has been isolated from marine sediments from the Shimokita Peninsula.

References

Chloroflexota
Bacteria genera
Monotypic bacteria genera